Mayssoun Azzam (born 1973) is a Palestinian TV anchor, news presenter, media instructor, member of the College of Media & Mass Communication Advisory Board at the American University in the Emirates (AUE) and humanitarian activist. 

For over a decade, Mayssoun Azzam has been one of the most prominent media figures in the Arab world. Working with the Dubai based      Al Arabiya news channel since its launch in 2003, Mayssoun Azzam has proven high level of professionalism as a news presenter, current affairs program anchor, interviewer and lecturer.  

She has interviewed several prominent figures and decision-makers including Palestinian President Mahmoud Abbas, Saudi State Minister for Foreign Affairs Adel al-Jubair, The UAE State Minister for Foreign Affairs Anwar Gergash, former UK Prime Minister Tony Blair and Microsoft founder Bill Gates among others.  In addition, she reported from the embattled West Bank in Palestine where she was embedded with international activists who were helping Palestinian farmers harvest their olives and protecting from the hostilities of the Jewish settlers.

Al Arabiya was the media sponsor for the Palestinian first investment conference held in Bethlehem, and she was chosen to MC the inauguration which included keynote speakers like President Mahmoud Abbas among others.

Believing in the importance of supporting woman in all fields, she produced eleven episodes about the obstacles facing pregnant women at work. She broke the classic image of Arab news presenters and shared the ups and downs she went through as a working pregnant presenter.

Mayssoun was appointed as the Ambassador of Nescafe Red Mug (2010/11) to highlight health benefits of coffee and to address the myths surrounding habitual coffee drinking.

Her reputation as a highly professional media expert qualified her to work as an instructor at Mohammed Bin Rashid School for communication, in the American University in Dubai (AUD), where she taught several courses including Multi-platform Story-telling and Media, Culture and Society, and Advanced Reporting. 

Currently Mayssoun Azzam is focusing her work on humanitarian issues. She is the main anchor of a special one-hour daily news bulletin that focuses on tackles regional human-interest stories ranging from the ordeal of refugees to the suffering of children in war-torn areas. She visited several refugee camps in Jordan and Yemen where she carried out intensive coverage of the refugees living conditions and sufferings, in addition to field reporting and an embedded reporter with International Activists from a war zone in Palestine. 

The bulletin is aired Sunday-Thursday at 1400 GMT and is steadily turning to be one of the most watched news bulletins, with increasing viewership rates in different targeted markets.  

Through her contacts and activities, Mayssoun Azzam has helped the bulletin open different thorny issues and organize campaigns to help the needy in the region. Mayssoun Azzam is an active part of the team, suggesting stories, contacting guests and providing contacts with international humanitarian aid agencies. 

Her contributions in the humanitarian field gained regional recognition. In August 2019, she was honored by The RNVDO organization, operating in the northern Iraqi governorate of Nineveh, as Representative of Nineveh Voluntary for IDPs 2019. 

Mayssoun participated in many conferences as a moderator such as Nato foundation(2019 and 2021) Davos (2018 and 2019) and Beirut Institute and also as a key speaker in many seminars such as the 12th International Conference of the Arab-US Association for Communication Educators held in Zayed University, the Arab Satellite Channels Conference in Jordan and a conference organized by the Arab Women Organization about the suffering of displaced women in the regions 

During her working experience in Al Arabiya, Mayssoun anchored for three years a two-hours, weekly talk show, Mashahed wa Ara’ (مشاهد وآراء).

Mayssoun also wrote a number of political and social articles that were published on AlArabiya.net website.

Early life
Mayssoun Azzam was born in Abu Dhabi, UAE to a Palestinian family. Her parents, Nawaf Azzam and Isaaf El-Youssef, fled Palestine to Lebanon in 1948. Her father graduated from the Beirut Arab University with a law degree. However, he was unable to practice law due to labor laws in Lebanon that restricted Palestinians from most white-collar professions. He worked as a school administrator at the Ain al-Hilweh Palestinian refugee camp in Sidon before moving his family to the Persian Gulf region. Mayssoun grew up in Abu Dhabi where she attended the Rosary School. She later earned her bachelor's degree in Communication Arts, emphasis in Journalism from the Lebanese American University. Her master's degree was earned at the University of London, Birkbeck, majoring in Global Politics.

References

1973 births
Living people
Palestinian journalists
Al Arabiya people
Academic staff of the American University in Dubai
Lebanese American University alumni
Alumni of Birkbeck, University of London
People from Abu Dhabi

External Links 
 Mayssoun Azzam’s LinkedIn